Malachi is the eponymous debut album released by Fame Academy contestant Malachi Cush. The album was released on 24 March 2003 and features his debut single "Just Say You Love Me", along with some cover versions that he performed on Fame Academy. The album reached number 17 in the UK Album Chart in April 2003.

Track listing

Chart performance
The album reached number 17 in the UK Album Chart in April 2003 but only remained in the top 40 for one week.

See also
List of music releases from Fame Academy contestants

References

2003 debut albums
Mercury Records albums